Tatler is a British magazine published by Condé Nast Publications focusing on fashion and lifestyle, as well as coverage of high society and politics. It is targeted towards the British upper-middle class and upper class, and those interested in society events. Its readership is the wealthiest of all Condé Nast's publications. It was founded in 1901 by Clement Shorter. Tatler is also published in Russia by Conde Nast, and by Edipresse Media Asia.

History

Tatler was introduced on 3 July 1901, by Clement Shorter, publisher of The Sphere. It was named after the original literary and society journal founded by Richard Steele in 1709. It contained news and pictures of high society balls, charity events, race meetings, shooting parties, fashion and gossip, with cartoons by "The Tout" and H. M. Bateman.

In 1940, the magazine absorbed The Bystander, creating a publication called The Tatler and Bystander. In 1961, Illustrated Newspapers, which published Tatler, The Sphere, and The Illustrated London News, was bought by Roy Thomson. In 1965, Tatler was retitled London Life. In 1968, it was bought by Guy Wayte's Illustrated County Magazine group and the Tatler name restored. Wayte's group had a number of county magazines in the style of Tatler, each of which mixed the same syndicated content with county-specific local content. Wayte, "a moustachioed playboy of a conman" was convicted of fraud in 1980 for inflating Tatlers circulation figures from 15,000 to 49,000.

The magazine was sold and relaunched as a monthly magazine in 1977, called Tatler & Bystander until 1982. Tina Brown (editor 1979–83), created a vibrant and youthful Tatler and is credited with putting the edge, the irony and the wit back into what was then an almost moribund social title. She referred to it as an upper-class comic and by increasing its influence and circulation made it an interesting enough operation for the then owner, Gary Bogard, to sell to publishers Condé Nast. Brown subsequently transferred to New York, to another Condé Nast title, Vanity Fair.

After several later editors and a looming recession, the magazine was once again ailing; Jane Procter was brought in to re-invent the title for the 1990s. The circulation rose to over 90,000, a figure which was exceeded five years later by Geordie Greig. The magazine created various supplements including the Travel and Restaurant Guides, the often-referred to and closely watched Most Invited and Little Black Book lists, as well as various parties.

Kate Reardon became editor in 2011. She was previously a fashion assistant on American Vogue and then, aged 21, became the youngest-ever fashion director of Tatler. Under Reardon's directorship Tatler retained its position as having the wealthiest audience of Condé Nast's magazines, exceeding an average of $175,000 in 2013.

Reardon left the title at the end of 2017. The appointment of Richard Dennen as the new editor was announced at the beginning of February 2018, and he took up the post on 12 February.

In 2014, the BBC broadcast a three-part fly-on-the-wall documentary television series, titled Posh People: Inside Tatler, featuring the editorial team going about their various jobs.

In 2021, Tatler commissioned Nigerian painter Oluwole Omofemi to paint the last painting of Queen Elizabeth II before her demise.

Little Black Book
One of Tatlers most talked-about annual features is the Little Black Book. The supplement is a compilation of "the most eligible, most beddable, most exotically plumaged birds and blokes in town", and individuals previously featured have included those from a number of backgrounds: aristocrats and investment bankers sit alongside celebrities and those working in the media sector.

Editors and contributors

Past and present editors

Past contributors
Christina Broom – photographer
Diana, Lady Mosley – commissioned to write a Letters from Paris section in the 1960s.
Una-Mary Parker – Social editor in the 1970s
The Marchioness of Milford Haven – Social editor
Isabella Blow – Contributing fashion editor-at-large

Other editions

References

Further reading

External links
 – official site
 – Tatler Asia site

1901 establishments in the United Kingdom
Fashion magazines published in the United Kingdom
Lifestyle magazines published in the United Kingdom
Monthly magazines published in the United Kingdom
Magazines established in 1901